is a Japanese voice actress and singer affiliated with 81 Produce. She had a leading role in the anime series Seiyu's Life!, where she became part of the musical unit Earphones. She voiced Futaba Ichinose in Seiyu's Life!, Megumin in KonoSuba, Emilia in Re:Zero − Starting Life in Another World, Takagi-san in Teasing Master Takagi-san, Mash Kyrielight in Fate/Grand Order, Mirai Asahina/Cure Miracle in Witchy PreCure!, Dan Kouzo in Bakugan: Battle Planet, and Hu Tao in Genshin Impact. She performed theme songs for the same series. She won the Best Female Newcomer at the 10th Seiyu Awards.

Biography
Takahashi was born in Saitama Prefecture. She watched Ojamajo Doremi, Higurashi When They Cry and Soul Eater while in high school. She noticed that many male characters were voiced by female voice actors; as this fact interested her, she decided to pursue a career in voice acting. She joined her school's broadcasting club during her third year of high school, and she also won a special citation for voice acting at the 4th High School Animation Fair. During her third year of high school, Takahashi participated in an audition sponsored by the voice acting agency 81 Produce. After graduating from Koshigaya-Minami High school, she attended 81 Produce's training school, 81 Actor's Studio. While continuing with her lessons, she became part of the voice actor unit Anisoni∀, alongside Reina Ueda, Chiyeri Hayashida and Kayoto Tsumita. After graduating from the 81 Actor's Studio in 2013, she formally joined 81 Produce. She worked many part time jobs such as at supermarkets and a bra factory.

In 2013, she played background or supporting roles in each series, such as Stella Women’s Academy, High School Division Class C³, Driland and Aikatsu. She also played the role of a student in a voiced comic stream of the online manga Pokémon Card Game XY: Yarouze!. In 2015, she played her first lead role as Futaba Ichinose in the anime television series Seiyu's Life!. Takahashi, together with Seiyu's Life! co-stars Marika Kouno and Yuki Nagaku, formed the musical unit Earphones. That same year, she was cast as the characters Miki Naoki in School-Live! and Kaon Lanchester in Comet Lucifer. She and fellow School-Live! co-stars Inori Minase, Ari Ozawa, and Mao Ichimichi, performed the series' opening theme . In March 2016, Takahashi received the Best Newcomer Award at the 10th Seiyu Awards. She was then cast as the character Megumin in the anime series KonoSuba; she and co-stars Sora Amamiya and Ai Kayano performed the series' closing theme . She also voiced the roles of Noct Leaflet in Undefeated Bahamut Chronicle, OL in Digimon Universe: Appli Monsters, Mirai Asahina in Maho Girls PreCure!, and Code Omega 00 Yufilia in Ange Vierge. She played Emilia in the anime series Re:Zero − Starting Life in Another World; Takahashi performed the series' second closing theme "Stay Alive". Later that year, she was cast as the character Mash Kyrielight in the mobile phone game Fate/Grand Order, replacing Risa Taneda who had gone on hiatus earlier that year. In 2017, Takahashi reprised the role of Megumin in the second season of KonoSuba, where she, Amamiya and Kayano performed the series' closing theme . She played Aqua Aino in Love Tyrant, and Ernesti Echevarria in Knight's & Magic. In 2018, she played Takagi in the anime series Teasing Master Takagi-san, where she performed the series' ending themes. She also played the roles of Tsubasa Katsuki in Comic Girls and Sagiri Ameno in Yuuna and the Haunted Hot Springs. In 2019, she played Nozomi Makino in Magical Girl Spec-Ops Asuka. and reprised her role as Takagi-san in  Teasing Master Takagi-san, where she performed the series' closing themes.

In February 2021, Takahashi announced her debut as a solo singer under A-Sketch/Astro Voice on April, along with the launch of her official fanclub, . Her debut album  was released on June 23, 2021. In March 2022, Takahashi received the Best Supporting Actress Award at the 16th Seiyu Awards.

Filmography

Anime television

Original net animation (ONA)

Original video animation (OVA)

Anime films

Video games

Live-action

Dubbing roles

Animation

Live action

Discography

Singles

Extended plays

References

External links
  
 Official agency profile 
 

1994 births
81 Produce voice actors
21st-century Japanese actresses
21st-century Japanese singers
21st-century Japanese women singers
Living people
Anime singers
Earphones (band) members
Japanese women pop singers
Japanese video game actresses
Japanese voice actresses
Seiyu Award winners
Voice actresses from Saitama Prefecture
A-Sketch artists